The Witches of Gambaga is a Ghanaian 2011 documentary film directed by Yaba Badoe and produced by Amina Mama.

Plot
Women of various communities are accused of being witches by their families and how they fight the struggle of their society and community in the witch camp.

History of creation
In 2011, the film participated in Rio de Janeiro International Film Festival. In 2012, it was shown at the London Feminist Film Festival.

References

External links
 

2011 films
Films set in Ghana
Ghanaian documentary films